The Very Best of Jackie Martling's Talking Joke Book Cassettes, Vol. 1 is an album by American comedian, comedy writer and radio personality Jackie Martling.  The album was released on November 2, 1999 on the Oglio Records label.

Track listing
Lids & Lads
Ghosts & Gunk
Guzzlers & Gringos
Dopes & Danglers
Bags & Beasts
Jilters & Jerkers
Squawkers & Salamis
Superiors & Stuffers
Potions & Preachers
Sewers & Swiggers
Pissers & Parkers
Sippers & Soakers
Mobsters & Monarchs
Fools & The Faithful
Callers & Coaxers
Bunnies & Blockers
Smilers & Swatters
Wankers & Wipers
Cheaters & Chompers
Shoppers & Sisters
Fool's Gold

Background
In 1979, Martling issued his debut LP, What Did You Expect?  He released two more albums, 1980's Goin' Ape! and 1981's Normal People Are People You Don't Know That Well.  Martling sent all three records to fledgling New York City disk jockey Howard Stern. By 1986, he was a full-time member of Stern's show, later becoming the program's head writer. Martling maintained a steady schedule of live dates while working with Stern, recording Sgt. Pecker, F Jackie, and Hot Dogs + Donuts.  The Very Best of Jackie Martling's Talking Joke Book Cassettes, Vol. 1 is the fourth CD from Martling's Stern era.

Description
The album is a reissue of the first volume of the earliest recordings from "America's favorite joker". The CD includes 21 tracks, including the song 'Fools Gold' as heard on The Howard Stern Show.

Notes

1999 compilation albums
Jackie Martling albums
1990s comedy albums
Oglio Records compilation albums